Adalberto Hernández (born 27 June 1938) is a Mexican boxer who competed in the men's lightweight event at the 1960 Summer Olympics. At the 1960 Summer Olympics, he defeated Ghulam Sarwar of Pakistan, before losing to Salah Shokweir of the United Arab Republic.

References

External links
 

1938 births
Living people
Mexican male boxers
Olympic boxers of Mexico
Boxers at the 1960 Summer Olympics
Boxers from Mexico City
Lightweight boxers